Brownsville is an unincorporated community and census-designated place (CDP) in northeastern Bowling Green Township, Licking County, Ohio, United States. As of the 2010 census, it had a population of 220. It lies at the intersection of U.S. Route 40 with State Route 668.

Geography
The community's northern border is the boundary between Bowling Green Township and Hopewell Township, and the southern border follows Interstate 70. Access to I-70 is provided by Exit 141, a half-interchange directly south of the town on State Route 668, for traffic traveling to and from the west. Both I-70 and US-40 lead east  to Zanesville and west  to Columbus.

Brownsville is in the valley of Berry Run, a south-flowing tributary of Valley Run, which via Jonathan Creek is part of the Muskingum River watershed flowing south to the Ohio River.

Demographics

History
Brownsville starts when the National Road was extended to that point. The community was laid out in 1829. Brownsville was named for its founder, Adam Brown. A post office was established in 1830.

Notable person
 William M. Morgan, congressman

References

Census-designated places in Licking County, Ohio
1829 establishments in Ohio
Populated places established in 1829